At This Point in Time is an album by an eleven-piece band led by jazz drummer Elvin Jones that was recorded in 1973 and released in 1998.

Track listing
 "At This Point in Time" (Frank Foster) – 7:34
 "Currents/Pollen" (Gene Perla, Don Garcia) – 11:13
 "The Prime Element" (Omar Clay) – 8:19
 "Whims of Bal" (Clay) – 12:23
 "Pauke Tanz" (Clay) – 6:24
 "The Unknighted Nations" (Foster) – 6:28
 "Don't Cry (Keiko Jones) - 7:42

Personnel
 Elvin Jones – drums
 Frank Foster – soprano and tenor saxophone
 Steve Grossman – soprano and tenor saxophone
 Pepper Adams – baritone saxophone
 Jan Hammer – piano, electric piano, synthesizer
 Cornell Dupree – guitar
 Gene Perla – double bass, bass guitar
 Warren Smith – tympani
 Omar Clay – percussion, programmable rhythm box
 Candido Camero – congas
 Richie "Pablo" Landrum – percussion

References

Elvin Jones albums
1998 albums